Warrant Officer Patrick Tower, SMV, CD is a Canadian soldier who was the first recipient of the Star of Military Valour, a Canadian military decoration, in recognition of actions under enemy fire taken in the Pashmul region of Afghanistan. He had prior military service including the Battle of Medak Pocket and three tours in the former Yugoslavia with Canadian peacekeeping forces.

During the Panjwayi fighting in the summer of 2006, Tower was a section commander in 9 Platoon of the 1st Battalion, Princess Patricia's Canadian Light Infantry but by 3 August 2006, "(c)asualties had elevated (Tower) to second-in-command of the platoon of about thirty soldiers of Charlie Company who had been fighting that day." 

The citation for his Star of Military Valour reads:
Sergeant Patrick Tower, S.M.V., C.D.
Edmonton, Alberta, and Victoria, British Columbia
Star of Military Valour

Sergeant Tower is recognized for valiant actions taken on August 3, 2006, in the Pashmul region of Afghanistan. Following an enemy strike against an outlying friendly position that resulted in numerous casualties, Sergeant Tower assembled the platoon medic and a third soldier and led them across 150 metres of open terrain, under heavy enemy fire, to render assistance. On learning that the acting platoon commander had perished, Sergeant Tower assumed command and led the successful extraction of the force under continuous small arms and rocket-propelled grenade fire. Sergeant Tower’s courage and selfless devotion to duty contributed directly to the survival of the remaining platoon members.

References
 Governor General announces the first-ever awarding of Military Valour Decorations, October 27, 2006
 Star of Military Valour (S.M.V.)
 Canadian Forces Honours and Awards Chart
 Wattie, Chris Contact Charlie: The Canadian Army, The Taliban and the Battle that Saved Afghanistan (Key Porter Books Ltd., Toronto, ON, 2008)

Notes

Towers, Patrick
Living people
Year of birth missing (living people)
Recipients of the Star of Military Valour
Canadian military personnel of the War in Afghanistan (2001–2021)